The Serbia and Montenegro women's national under-20 basketball team was a national basketball team of Serbia and Montenegro, administered by the Basketball Federation of Serbia and Montenegro. It represented the country in women's international under-20 basketball competitions. The team won a silver medal at the 2006 FIBA Europe Under-20 Championship for Women Division B.

References

External links
Archived records of Serbia and Montenegro team participations

Basketball in Serbia and Montenegro
Basketball
Women's national under-20 basketball teams
Women's sport in Serbia and Montenegro